John Sturtevant (April 28, 1913 – May 10, 1974) was an American set decorator. He was nominated for an Academy Award in the category Best Art Direction for the film The Sand Pebbles.

Selected filmography
 The Sand Pebbles (1966)

References

External links

American set decorators
1913 births
1974 deaths